Lygromma is a spider genus of Central and South America. There are species with eight, six (e.g. L. senoculatum, L. valencianum) and no eyes. The eyeless L. anops is endemic to Galapagos, while the not closely related blind L. gertschi is found only on Jamaica.

The Mexican genus Tivodrassus, and Tricongius have been suggested as sister groups of Lygromma.

Species reach a body length from about 2 to 4.6 mm.

Species
 it contains 19 species:
 Lygromma anops Peck & Shear, 1987 — Galapagos Islands
 Lygromma chamberlini Gertsch, 1941 — Panama, Colombia, Cuba
 Lygromma domingo Platnick & Shadab, 1981 — Ecuador
 Lygromma dybasi Platnick & Shadab, 1976 — Costa Rica, Panama
 Lygromma gasnieri Brescovit & Höfer, 1993 — Brazil
 Lygromma gertschi Platnick & Shadab, 1976 — Jamaica
 Lygromma huberti Platnick & Shadab, 1976 — Venezuela, Brazil
 Lygromma kochalkai Platnick & Shadab, 1976 — Colombia
 Lygromma nicolae Víquez, 2020 – Costa Rica
 Lygromma peckorum Platnick & Shadab, 1976 — Colombia
 Lygromma peruvianum Platnick & Shadab, 1976 — Peru
 Lygromma quindio Platnick & Shadab, 1976 — Colombia
 Lygromma senoculatum Simon, 1893 — Venezuela
 Lygromma simoni (Berland, 1913) — Ecuador
 Lygromma taruma Brescovit & Bonaldo, 1998 — Brazil
 Lygromma tuxtla Platnick, 1978 — Mexico
 Lygromma valencianum Simon, 1893 — Venezuela
 Lygromma volcan Platnick & Shadab, 1981 — Panama
 Lygromma wygodzinskyi Platnick, 1978 — Colombia

References

 Platnick, N.I. & Shadab, M.U. (1976). A revision of the spider genera Lygromma and Neozimiris (Araneae, Gnaphosidae). Amer. Mus. Novitates 2598:1-23. PDF (8Mb) - Abstract (with key to species)
 Platnick, N.I. (1977). Two new species of Lygromma (Araneae: Gnaphosidae). J. Arachnol. 5:151-152. PDF (L. tuxtla, L. wygodzinskyi)
 Shear, W.A. & Peck, S.B. (1992). Male of the blind cave gnaphosoid Lygromma anops (Araneae, Gnaphosoidea, Prodidomidae) from Galapagos Islands, Ecuador. Journal of Arachnology 20:69-71. PDF

Prodidominae
Spiders of Mexico
Spiders of Central America
Spiders of South America
Araneomorphae genera